Marinenko is an East Slavic surname. Notable people with the surname include:

 Nadezhda Marinenko (born 1951), Belarusian athlete
 Tatyana Marinenko (1920–1942), Soviet-Belarusian partisan

See also
 

East Slavic-language surnames